Dresser Island is an island in the Mississippi River.The island is entirely within St. Charles County, Missouri.

Dresser Island has the name of Thomas Dresser, a local landowner.

References

Landforms of St. Charles County, Missouri
River islands of Missouri
Islands of the Mississippi River